The Purtse River is river in Estonia in Ida-Viru and Lääne-Viru County. The river is 51.2 km long and basin size is 811 km2. It runs into the Gulf of Finland.

See also
List of rivers of Estonia

References

Rivers of Estonia
Landforms of Ida-Viru County
Landforms of Lääne-Viru County